"If I Could" was the second single by Australian rock-pop band 1927 from their debut album ...ish. The song was written by Garry Frost and released in October 1988. It peaked at number four on the ARIA Singles Chart and was certified gold.

The song was nominated for 'Highest Selling Single' at the ARIA Music Awards of 1989 but lost to "I Should Be So Lucky" by Kylie Minogue.

Track listing

Charts

Weekly chart

Year-end chart

Certifications

References

1927 (band) songs
1988 singles
Warner Music Group singles
Rock ballads
1988 songs